Denis Kudla and Yasutaka Uchiyama were the defending champions, but lost to Jared Donaldson and Stefan Kozlov in the quarterfinals.

Donaldson and Kozlov went on to win the title, defeating Chase Buchanan and Rhyne Williams in the final, 6–3, 6–4.

Seeds

Draw

Draw

References
 Main Draw
 Qualifying Draw

Royal Lahaina Challenger - Doubles
2015 Doubles